Black Coast is an English nu metalcore band from Stoke-on-Trent, United Kingdom.

History

Formation and Ill Minds Vol. 1 (2016-2020) 
The band was formed in January 2016 following the folding of the bands"Bet It All" and "Dead City Souls". The idea was originally pitched by Scott Pinnington to fellow guitarist Joe Mayer, who then invited bassist Jack Beardsall and drummer Matty Clark, with Charlie Hewitt finally arriving after a small number of practice sessions.

The name "Black Coast" was created by an ex-member of a different band, which was ultimately never used; Mayer then reiterated the name when the newly-formed band was looking for one.

A debut EP was released which resulted in a tour with Stray from the Path, with the band later touring Japan and supporting the bands Silent Screams and In Hearts Wake. The EP Ill Minds Vol. 1 was released on November 9, 2018.

Outworld (2021-present) 
Black Coast released the song "Paradise" on April 7, 2021, as the lead single from their album Outworld which would be released later that year. The recording process of the album proved to be problematic, with several songs not working out as they were conceived to be, as well as members facing writer's block, which they decided to remedy via covering the song A Place for My Head. The COVID-19 pandemic bought the band extra time to work on the album, which was in a complete state upon the release of "Paradise".

The second single from the album, "Strangers Skin", was released on 3 August.

Originally intended to be released on August 27, Outworld was ultimately postponed to a 19 November release.

Musical style and influences 
The band have cited their musical influences as being "all about the groove", with grunge band Alice in Chains, nu metal pioneers Limp Bizkit, Linkin Park and Deftones, and nu metal revival band Ocean Grove being highlighted by Hewitt as specific examples.

Discography

Studio albums 
 Outworld (2021)

EPs 
 Ill Minds Vol. 1 (2018)
 Ill Minds Vol. 2 (2019)

Members 
 Charlie Hewitt – vocals (2016–present)
 Scott Pinnington – guitar (2016–present)
 Joe Mayer – guitar (2016–present)
 Jack Beardsall – bass (2016–present)
 Matty Clark – drums (2016–present)

References 

English heavy metal musical groups
British nu metal musical groups
Musical groups established in 2016
2016 establishments in England